Peter Andrew Banaszak (born May 21, 1944) is a former player of college and professional American football.  A running back, he played college football at the University of Miami, and played professionally in the American Football League (AFL) for the Oakland Raiders from 1966 through 1969, and for the National Football League (NFL) Raiders from 1970 through 1978.

Career
Banaszak is from Crivitz, Wisconsin. Before his football career, while still a high school student, he considered becoming a priest.

He finished his three-year career with the Miami Hurricanes with 263 carries for 1,107 yards and nine touchdowns and 35 catches for 356 yards and three touchdowns. 

Banaszak finished his NFL career (all with the Raiders from 1966 to 1978) with 3,772 rushing yards, 121 receptions for 1,022 yards, and 51 touchdowns.  He was known for "having a nose for the goal line".  He was known by his Raider teammates and fans as "Rooster".

Banaszak was a member of the Raiders during their first Super Bowl appearance in Super Bowl II.  He also scored two touchdowns in the Raiders 32-14 win over the Minnesota Vikings in Super Bowl XI. He was also a part of the 'Holy Roller' play that led to rule changes in the NFL about advancing fumbles.  Banaszak appeared to try to recover the ball on the 12-yard line, but could not keep his footing, and pitched the ball with both hands even closer to the end zone.

Banaszak currently resides in the St. Augustine, Florida area and co-hosts the post game radio show for the Jacksonville Jaguars with Cole Pepper.  He was inducted into the National Polish-American Sports Hall of Fame in 1990.

References

External links
National Polish-American Sports HOF profile

1944 births
Living people
People from Crivitz, Wisconsin
Players of American football from Wisconsin
American football running backs
Miami Hurricanes football players
Oakland Raiders players
Jacksonville Jaguars announcers
National Football League announcers
American Football League players